Marina Vladimirovna Mulyayeva (born April 30, 1981) is a Kazakh former swimmer, who specialized in sprint freestyle and individual medley events. She is a six-time national record holder, a multiple-time ACC titleholder, and a one-time NCAA Honorable Mention All-American swimmer. Mulyayeva is also a varsity swimmer for the Maryland Terrapins and an international business major at the University of Maryland in College Park, Maryland.

Mulyayeva made her first Kazakh team, as a 19-year-old, at the 2000 Summer Olympics in Sydney, where she competed in the women's 200 m individual medley. She edged out Kyrgyzstan's Alexandra Zertsalova on the freestyle leg to lead the first heat in 2:24.09. 

At the 2004 Summer Olympics in Athens, Mulyayeva placed twenty-fifth in the 200 m individual medley. Swimming in the same heat from Sydney, she edged out Denmark's Louise Mai Jansen to save a fifth spot by nearly three seconds in 2:24.25.

Mulyayeva decided to drop her specialty event, the 200 m individual medley, and experiment with the 50 m freestyle, when she competed for her third time at the 2008 Summer Olympics in Beijing. She achieved a FINA B-standard of 26.30 from the Kazakhstan Open Championships in Almaty. She challenged seven other swimmers in heat seven, including fellow three-time Olympic veteran Mariya Bugakova of Uzbekistan. She raced to sixth place by three hundredths of a second (0.03) behind Hong Kong's Elaine Chan in 26.57. Mulyayeva failed to advance into the semifinals, as she placed forty-sixth overall out of 92 swimmers in the preliminaries.

References

External links
Player Bio – Maryland Terrapins
NBC Olympics Profile

1981 births
Living people
Kazakhstani female medley swimmers
Olympic swimmers of Kazakhstan
Swimmers at the 2000 Summer Olympics
Swimmers at the 2004 Summer Olympics
Swimmers at the 2008 Summer Olympics
Kazakhstani female freestyle swimmers
Sportspeople from Almaty
Maryland Terrapins women's swimmers
University of Maryland, College Park alumni